Sir John Bryn Edwards, 1st Baronet (12 January 1889 – 22 August 1922) was a Welsh ironmaster and philanthropist whose seemingly promising future as a figure of political and social leadership in post-World War I Britain was cut short by death at the age of 33.

Edwards was educated at Winchester College and received his BA and MA from Trinity Hall, Cambridge. As the owner of a major metalworking concern known as the Duffryn Steel and Tinplate Works, he had the resources to fund a number of philanthropic and charitable endeavours for which he was recognised in the 1921 Birthday Honours by being created, at the unusually young age of 32, a baronet of Treforis in the County of Glamorgan.

Edwards married Kathleen Ermyntrude Corfield, daughter of John Corfield, managing director of Dillwyn & Co, on 18 January 1911. They had a son and a daughter. In the years following his death, Hendrefoilan House, which he purchased in 1920, became part of the campus of Swansea University and was the site, until 2006, of the South Wales Miners' Library.

Footnotes

References
Who Was Who, vol II, 1916−1928 (third edition, 1962). London: Adam & Charles Black.
"Wills and Bequests", The Times, 1 November 1922

20th-century Welsh businesspeople
Welsh philanthropists
People educated at Winchester College
Alumni of Trinity Hall, Cambridge
Baronets in the Baronetage of the United Kingdom
People from Glamorgan
1889 births
1922 deaths
20th-century British philanthropists